Abdelaal is a surname. Notable people with the surname include:
Ahmad Abdelaal, MD born in Mansoura, Surgeon 
Ahmed Abdelaal (born 1989), Egyptian volleyball player
Mahmoud Abdelaal (born 1992), Egyptian boxer
Mohamed Abdelaal (born 1990), Egyptian judoka